Cindy Daniel (born May 6, 1986 in Montreal, Quebec) is a Québécois singer.

After her debut album La petite indienne in 2002, the following year, she played the role of Elvira in the French Canadian musical version of Don Juan by Félix Gray. She also appeared on the album released on the occasion.

Signed to the Montreal-based independent record label MP3 Disques established by singer Mario Pelchat, she released two albums with the label, J'avoue in 2006 produced by Mario Pelchat and Le tout premier jour in 2008 also with Pelchat's participation and the compilation Entre nous... 10 ans déjà! in 2011. She is very well known in the Quebec and French-Canadian public with her 2006 big hit "Sous une pluie d'étoiles" from her album J'avoue charting at top of the local charts. She was nominated for a Felix award nomination in ADISQ 2007. Many renowned artists have written for her including Johnny Hallyday, Jean-Jacques Goldman, Georges Moustaki, Louis Côté and Rick Allison. She has also taken small roles in a number of films.

Personal life 
Cindy's family background are of Indian, Irish and Italian descent. Since December 2006, she is a mother of one child.

Discography

Albums
2002: La petite indienne
2006: J'avoue
2008: Le tout premier jour
2011; Entre nous... 10 ans déjà!

Appearances
2003: Don Juan (album of musical, with various artists)

Singles
2002: "Si tu veux partir"
2006: "Sous une pluie d'étoiles"
2006: "Notre génération"
2007: "Une promesse"
2008: "Quand tu ne m'aimeras plus"
2010: "Dans le vent"
2011: "Entre nous"
2014: "Une fois pour de bon"

References 
 http://www.qim.com/artistes/biographie.asp?artistid=539

External links 
 Official Site
 Facebook

1986 births
Living people
Francophone Quebec people
Singers from Montreal
Canadian people of Italian descent
Canadian people of Irish descent
French-language singers of Canada
Canadian women pop singers
21st-century Canadian women singers